Edwin Cocker (born 03/11/ 1980) is a New Zealand rugby union player who plays for the New Zealand Sevens team. He has a twin brother Sione, who plays Sevens for Tonga. His father Kepelielie was a rugby union player for Tonga. Edwin was an alumnus of St Paul's College, Auckland.

References

External links 
 

New Zealand rugby union players
1980 births
Living people
Twin sportspeople
New Zealand twins
New Zealand sportspeople of Tongan descent
Rugby union players from Auckland
New Zealand international rugby sevens players
Male rugby sevens players
People educated at St Paul's College, Auckland